Isabella Hoppringle (1460–1538), was a Scottish prioress and spy. She was the prioress of Coldstream Priory in 15051538.

Belonging to a family who often provided prioresses to the priory in Coldstream, she became installed in the position in 1505. She was a personal friend to the Scottish queen dowager regent, Margaret Tudor. As the monastery was near the border of England and Scotland, it was in the midst of the warfare between the nations in 1513. She skillfully managed to balance between the two nations to the benefit of the priory and was reputed as the best agent England had in Scotland. In 1538, she was succeeded as superior – and reputedly as agent – by her relative Janet Pringle.

Bibliography 
 The Biographical Dictionary of Scottish Women, Elizabeth L. Ewan, Sue Innes, Edinburgh University Press, 2006,

References 

1460 births
1538 deaths
16th-century spies
16th-century Scottish people
Scottish Roman Catholic abbesses
15th-century Scottish women
16th-century Scottish women